Ramilla Ramesh, better known as Thagubothu Ramesh, is an Indian actor and comedian who works in Telugu films. He is a recipient of Nandi Award for Best Male Comedian. He got the moniker "Thagubothu" as he portrayed several roles as a drunkard. His notable roles are in films such as Mahatma, Ala Modalaindi, Pilla Zamindar and Ishq.

Early life
Ramesh was born in Godavarikhani located in Karimnagar district, Telangana. His father was an employee at Singareni Collieries Company and his mother was a housewife. He was able to sink into the drunkard character because, as a child he would watch his father get drunk and hit his mother. He would pacify his mother, and make her laugh by impersonating his drunk father.

Career
Ramesh eventually became good at mimicry and used to perform shows in his town. He also reveals that he is inspired by Bengali comedian Keshto Mukherjee, who like him was also famous for portraying drunkard characters. Before venturing into films, Ramesh has worked as a building supervisor for 10 years. After his parents' death and sister's marriage, he decided to pursue acting as a career. In 2005, he joined the Akkineni Film Institute in Hyderabad.

Film career
In 2006, after graduating from Akkineni Film Institute, Ramesh got an opportunity to play a small role in Sukumar’s Jagadam. This was his first feature film. After Jagadam, Ramesh found several opportunities and acted in around 10 Telugu films. During this time, Ramesh got acquainted with popular Telugu actor Uttej. Uttej introduced Ramesh to top Telugu film director Krishna Vamsi. Vamsi cast him for the role of a drunkard in Mahatma. The film remains as a major turning point in his career. His portrayal of drunkard character in Mahatma led to an opportunity to play a similar drunkard character in Ala Modalaindi directed by Nandini Reddy.  His portrayal of Gowtham, a drunkard software engineer in the film became very popular among the moviegoers. Since that film, he was more commonly referred to as "Thagubothu Ramesh" (drunkard Ramesh).

Personal life
He married Swathi in 2015.
He is also a team leader in ETV Telugu program Jabardasth.

Awards
 Nandi Award for Best Male Comedian for the movie, Venkatadri Express - 2013

Filmography

Television

References

External links
 

Living people
People from Karimnagar district
Male actors from Telangana
Indian male comedians
Indian male film actors
Telugu comedians
21st-century Indian male actors
Male actors in Telugu cinema
Year of birth missing (living people)